The 2014 FSP Gold River Women's Challenger is a professional tennis tournament played on outdoor hard courts. It is the third edition of the tournament which is part of the 2014 ITF Women's Circuit, offering a total of $50,000 in prize money. It takes place in Sacramento, California, United States, on July 7–13, 2014.

Singles main draw entrants

Seeds 

 1 Rankings as of June 23, 2014

Other entrants 
The following players received wildcards into the singles main draw:
  Emina Bektas
  Jessica Lawrence
  Peggy Porter
  Zoë Gwen Scandalis

The following players received entry from the qualifying draw:
  Jennifer Brady
  Macall Harkins
  Natalie Pluskota
  Chanelle Van Nguyen

Champions

Singles 

  Olivia Rogowska def.  Julia Boserup 6–2, 7–5

Doubles 

  Daria Gavrilova /  Storm Sanders def.  Maria Sanchez /  Zoë Gwen Scandalis 6–2, 6–1

External links 
 2014 FSP Gold River Women's Challenger at ITFtennis.com
 Official website 

Sacramento
FSP Gold River Women's Challenger
2014 in sports in California
2014 in American tennis